Partitioning defective 3 homolog B is a protein that in humans is encoded by the PARD3B gene.

Interactions
PARD3B has been shown to interact with Mothers against decapentaplegic homolog 3.

References

Further reading